Thomas Nathaniel "Sandy" McDermott (March 15, 1856 – November 23, 1922) was a professional baseball player. He appeared in one game in Major League Baseball as a second baseman for the Baltimore Orioles on June 18, 1885 but never had an at bat. He had an extensive career in the minor leagues that lasted through 1897, including four seasons with the Fall River Indians in the New England League. He also managed the Poughkeepsie Colts in the Hudson River League in the 1903 season.

He died in 1922 in Mansfield, Ohio of stomach cancer.

References

External links

Major League Baseball second basemen
Baltimore Orioles (AA) players
Waterbury (minor league baseball) players
Haverhill (minor league baseball) players
Newburyport Clamdiggers players
Akron Acorns players
Manchester Farmers players
Columbus Buckeyes (minor league) players
Easton (minor league baseball) players
Newark Little Giants players
Woonsocket (minor league baseball) players
Rochester Hop Bitters players
Providence Clamdiggers (baseball) players
Lewiston (minor league baseball) players
Fall River Indians players
Belfast Pastimes players
New Bedford Whalers (baseball) players
New Bedford Browns players
Minor league baseball managers
Baseball players from Ohio
19th-century baseball players
1856 births
1922 deaths
Deaths from cancer in Ohio